The 1977 Southern 500, the 28th running of the event, was a NASCAR Winston Cup Series race that took place on September 5, 1977, at Darlington Raceway in Darlington, South Carolina.

Background
Darlington Raceway, nicknamed by many NASCAR fans and drivers as "The Lady in Black" or "The Track Too Tough to Tame" and advertised as a "NASCAR Tradition", is a race track built for NASCAR racing located near Darlington, South Carolina. It is of a unique, somewhat egg-shaped design, an oval with the ends of very different configurations, a condition which supposedly arose from the proximity of one end of the track to a minnow pond the owner refused to relocate. This situation makes it very challenging for the crews to set up their cars' handling in a way that will be effective at both ends.

The track is a four-turn  oval. The track's first two turns are banked at twenty-five degrees, while the final two turns are banked two degrees lower at twenty-three degrees. The front stretch (the location of the finish line) and the back stretch is banked at six degrees. Darlington Raceway can seat up to 60,000 people.

Darlington has something of a legendary quality among drivers and older fans; this is probably due to its long track length relative to other NASCAR speedways of its era and hence the first venue where many of them became cognizant of the truly high speeds that stock cars could achieve on a long track. The track allegedly earned the moniker The Lady in Black because the night before the race the track maintenance crew would cover the entire track with fresh asphalt sealant, in the early years of the speedway, thus making the racing surface dark black. Darlington is also known as "The Track Too Tough to Tame" because drivers can run lap after lap without a problem and then bounce off of the wall the following lap. Racers will frequently explain that they have to race the racetrack, not their competition. Drivers hitting the wall are considered to have received their "Darlington Stripe" thanks to the missing paint on the right side of the car.

Race report

Drivers competed for a total of purse $184,200 ($ when considering inflation). Dave Marcis drove much of the race in relief of Richard Petty.

The race covered 367 laps tof the  paved track, totalling . After six yellow flags for 93 laps and 32 different leaders, the race lasted four hours and forty-one minutes. Rain on lap 185 forced to cars to slow down their speed until NASCAR confirmed that the rain indeed stopped in time for the green flag on lap 204. An oil slick on lap 210 would slow down the cars yet again until workers fixed the spill around lap 222. Pearson was winless in his first 15 Southern 500s, but then takes three out of four in 1976, 1977, and 1979.

Bill Elliott was driving the 52 in this race because it was a favor for Jimmy Means. Since Jimmy Means ran all the races, he was on the plan (guaranteed money for entering and starting a race). Elliott didn't run all the races so he wasn't on the plan. By running the 52 and gaining owner points for Means, it allowed Means to stay on the plan until he could race again.

Bill Elliott earned his first career top-ten finish. Terry Bivins made his final NASCAR appearance in this race. Notable crew chiefs to fully participate in this race were Buddy Parrott, Jake Elder, Joey Arrington, Kirk Shelmerdine, Dale Inman, and Tim Brewer.

Qualifying

Finishing order
Section reference: 

 David Pearson (No. 21)
 Donnie Allison (No. 1)
 Buddy Baker (No. 15)
 Richard Petty (No. 43)
 Cale Yarborough (No. 11)
 Darrell Waltrip (No. 88)
 Ricky Rudd (No. 22)
 Richard Childress (No. 3)
 Bruce Hill (No. 47)
 Bill Elliott (No. 52)
 Ed Negre (No. 8)
 J.D. McDuffie (No. 70)
 James Hylton (No. 48)
 Buddy Arrington (No. 67)
 Gary Myers (No. 4)
 Janet Guthrie (No. 68)
 Frank Warren (No. 79)
 Tommy Gale (No. 64)
 Cecil Gordon (No. 24)
 Mike Kempton (No. 69)
 Baxter Price (No. 45)
 Bobby Wawak (No. 19)
 Earle Canavan (No. 01)
 Terry Bivins* (No. 91)
 Benny Parsons* (No. 72)
 Coo Coo Marlin* (No. 14)
 D.K. Ulrich (No. 40)
 Lennie Pond* (No. 54)
 Sam Sommers* (No. 27)
 Ralph Jones* (No. 08)
 Dick May* (No. 10)
 Tighe Scott* (No. 30)
 Ferrel Harris* (No. 25)
 Dick Brooks* (No. 90)
 Butch Hartman* (No. 75)
 Roland Wlodyka* (No. 98)
 G.C. Spencer* (No. 49)
 Skip Manning* (No. 92)
 Bobby Allison* (No. 12)
 Joe Mihalic* (No. 61)

* Driver failed to finish race

Timeline
Section reference: 
 Start: Darrell Waltrip was ahead of all the other drivers as the green flag was waved in the air.
 Lap 24: First caution of the race due to Skip Manning's accident on turn 2; caution ended on lap 33.
 Lap 65: Second caution of the race due to a two-car accident; caution ended on lap 77.
 Lap 159: Third caution of the race due to Tighe Scott's accident on turn 4; caution ended on lap 168.
 Lap 185: Fourth caution of the race due to rain; caution ended on lap 204.
 Lap 210: Fifth caution of the race due to oil on the track; caution ended on lap 222.
 Lap 236: Sixth caution of the race due to a 5-car accident in the backstretch; caution ended on lap 249.
 Lap 251: Final caution of the race due to a 2-car accident on turn 4; caution ended on lap 262.
 Finish: David Pearson was officially declared the winner of the race.

Standings after the race

References

Southern 500
Southern 500
NASCAR races at Darlington Raceway